Jiangzhang railway station is a railway station in Jiangzhang, Fufeng County, Baoji, Shaanxi, China. It opened in 1936 on the Longhai railway. Passenger services were suspended in 2004. In September 2022, it was announced that passenger services would be restored in early September. However, the service started later, with three trains each way introduced on 10 November 2022.

References 

Railway stations in Shaanxi